Hadl is a surname. Notable people with the name include:
 Fahad Hadl (born 1988), Saudi Arabian footballer
 John Hadl (1940–2022), American football player

See also
 Haydel, surname